Armine is a name. It may refer to:

Given name
Armine Wodehouse (disambiguation)
Armine Dew (1867–1941), British Indian Army officer 
 Armine Khachatryan (born 1986), Armenian women's footballer
Armine Rhea Mendoza, Filipino female writer
Armine Sandford (1928–2011), English actress and news presenter
Armine Tadevosyan, Armenian women's footballer
Armine von Tempski (1892–1943), American female writer

Surname
Mary Armine (died 1676), English gentlewoman and benefactor
Sir William Armine, 1st Baronet (1593–1651), English politician
Sir William Armine, 2nd Baronet (1622–1658), English politician

See Արմինե for the origin of the Armenian feminine name

Surnames